The Microestadio Malvinas Argentinas is an indoor arena in La Paternal, Buenos Aires, Its construction began in the eighties but it was completely finished and officially inaugurated in 2006, that belongs to Argentinos Juniors club. Even though some basketball and volleyball matches are played at the stadium, it is mostly used for concerts.

Among others some bands that have played at this venue are Big Time Rush, Limp Bizkit, Korn, Die Toten Hosen, Paramore, Bad Religion, The Offspring, Fall Out Boy, Simple Plan, Creed, Demi Lovato, Placebo, Megadeth, Babasonicos, Manu Chao, Nightwish, Tarja Turunen, Avril Lavigne, Franz Ferdinand, SOJA, Slash, Black Label Society, Rata Blanca and Almafuerte. It has also hosted the Nickelodeon Argentina Kids' Choice Awards since 2011.

The name reflects Argentina's claims of sovereignty over the Falkland Islands (Islas Malvinas in Spanish).

The stadium can be reached by Urquiza Line, at Arata station, by San Martín Line, at La Paternal station, or by nearby Line B, at Tronador-Villa Ortúzar station.

External links
 Official website

References 

Indoor arenas in Argentina
Music venues in Argentina
Sports venues in Buenos Aires
Basketball venues in Argentina
Volleyball venues in Argentina